Joseph Willibald Kellerhoven (27 April 1789,  Mannheim - 18 June 1849, Speyer) was a German portrait painter.

Biography 
He was the son of Moritz Kellerhoven, court painter for Charles Theodore, Elector of Bavaria and, in 1808, one of the first professors at the expanded Academy of Fine Arts, Munich.

Joseph entered the Academy in 1809 and received practical training in the history painting department. He exhibited his works for the first time in 1814.

In 1818, he married Friederike Feiler, the daughter of Friedrich Feiler, an official in the Prussian Ministry of War. Shortly after, he moved to Speyer, to accept a position as a drawing teacher at the Royal gymnasium. In 1825, the city opened a trade school, so he left the gymnasium to accept a similar position there, as the salary was higher. Friederike died two years later, aged only twenty-nine. Both of their sons died before reaching adulthood.

After 1839, he worked as an art teacher at the newly-established Catholic school. In 1840, he remarried, to Elisabeth Werner, the daughter of a local landowner. The marriage remained childless.

In 1842, he suffered what was most likely a brain hemorrhage, which left him partially paralyzed and unable to work. Elisabeth cared for him until his death, seven years later.

Sources 
 Fritz Klotz: "Der Speyerer Maler Joseph Kellerhoven". In Pfälzer Heimat, 1965, pps.8–11
 Viktor Carl: Lexikon Pfälzer Persönlichkeiten. Hennig Verlag, Edenkoben, 2004, pg. 434  
 Georg Kaspar Nagler: Neues allgemeines Künstler-Lexicon. Vol. 6, Munich, 1838, pg. 555  Online @ Google Books

External links

1789 births
1849 deaths
19th-century German painters
19th-century German male artists
German portrait painters
Academy of Fine Arts, Munich alumni
Artists from Mannheim